The Pride of the Clan is a 1917 American silent romantic drama film directed by Maurice Tourneur, and starring Mary Pickford and Matt Moore.

Cast

Mary Pickford as Marget MacTavish
Matt Moore as Jamie Campbell
Warren Cook as Robert, Earl of Dunstable
 Kathryn Browne-Decker as The Countess of Dunstable (credited as Kathryn Browne Decker)
Ed Roseman as David Pitcairn
 Joel Day as The Dominie
Leatrice Joy - uncredited

Plot 
"After her father, the chieftain of a clan off the western coast of Scotland, dies at sea during a storm, Marget MacTavish consoles the other clan members even though she is heartbroken. On the Sabbath, Marget takes command as chieftain and drives everyone into the nearly empty church, except for David Pitcairn, who thinks that praying is fruitless. When Marget and Jamie Campbell, a young fisherman, become engaged in a traditional ceremony, Mrs. Campbell writes to the Countess of Dunstable and confesses that years earlier, she, as Jamie's nurse, reported Jamie's death so that she could raise him. The countess arrives with her second husband, an Earl, who convinces Marget that for Jamie's sake she should break the engagement. Although Jamie protests, Marget uses her authority as chieftain to command him to leave her. Marget drifts to sea to leave the area, but her old, unseaworthy vessel begins to sink. Pitcairn awakens and rings an alarm, then prays for Marget as Jamie takes a power boat from his mother's yacht and rescues her. Jamie's parents then accept the marriage."

Production 
The film was shot in Marblehead, Massachusetts and Fort Lee, New Jersey where many early film studios in America's first motion picture industry were based there at the beginning of the 20th century.

References

External links

The Pride of the Clan available for free download from Internet Archive
Pride of the Clan (Online Film)

1917 films
1917 romantic drama films
American romantic drama films
American silent feature films
American black-and-white films
Films directed by Maurice Tourneur
Films shot in Massachusetts
Films shot in Fort Lee, New Jersey
Articles containing video clips
1910s American films
Silent romantic drama films
Silent American drama films